The list of municipalities of Belgium is a survey of the following lists because Belgium is divided in three regions: 
 Brussels-Capital Region or Brussels, see List of municipalities of the Brussels-Capital Region (19 municipalities)
 Flemish Region or Flanders, see List of municipalities of the Flemish Region (300 municipalities)
 Walloon Region or Wallonia, see List of municipalities of the Walloon Region (262 municipalities)

See also 
 Municipalities of Belgium

 
Belgium
Municipalities